The Râiosul or Ileana is a left tributary of the river Câlniștea in Romania. It flows into the Câlniștea in Naipu.

References

Rivers of Romania
Rivers of Giurgiu County